Bonham Road Government Primary School is a primary school in Sai Ying Pun, Hong Kong. Its school building is a declared monument of Hong Kong.

Rachel Yeo of the South China Morning Post wrote that "The building is considered to be a rare surviving example of a structure that served both primary and tertiary institutions."

It is one of multiple schools in Primary One Admission (POA) School Net 11, and it is one of two government schools in the net (the remainder are aided schools, which operate independently but are funded with government money). Neighbourhoods in the net include Central, Kennedy Town, Sai Ying Pun, Shek Tong Tsui, Sheung Wan, and Victoria Peak.

History
The school itself began operations on 25 January 2000, originating from the Li Sing Afternoon Primary School (李陞小學下午校).

The building was constructed in 1940 and 1941. Northcote Training College, later known as Northcote College of Education in the 1970s, was the first occupant. During the Japanese occupation of Hong Kong the police of the Imperial Japanese Armed Forces used the facility as an administrative centre. The training college resumed its use of the facility in March of 1946. In 1962 the training college moved out of the building, and United College of the Chinese University of Hong Kong used the building in the period from then until 1971, when the training college moved back in. The college left the building again in 1997, and the primary school began occupying the facility in 2000.

The school building is a declared monument since 16 July 2021.

See also
 Bonham Road
 Diocesan Native Female Training School
 List of schools in Central and Western District
 List of primary schools in Hong Kong
 List of government schools in Hong Kong

References

External links

 Bonham Road Government Primary School 
 
 

Primary schools in Hong Kong
Declared monuments of Hong Kong
Sai Ying Pun
Government schools in Hong Kong
2000 establishments in Hong Kong
Educational institutions established in 2000